Leiostyla anglica is a species of small air-breathing land snail, a terrestrial pulmonate gastropod mollusk in the family Lauriidae.

Description
For terms see gastropod shell

The 3.1-3.7 x 1.7-2.1 mm shell is oval with 5-6.5 very slightly convex whorls. The apertural margin is U-shaped with a pronounced circular angular sinus and a strong angularis. The parietalis is also strong but deeper inside. There is strong columellaris an 2 weaker and deeper palatal folds. In colour the shell is red brown. It is almost smooth or weakly striated. The animal is light, almost transparent except for the greyish head and tentacles. The upper tentacles are long, the lower tentacles are very short, like tubercles.

Distribution
This species is known to occur in a number of European countries and islands:
 Great Britain
 Ireland
 Portugal
 France
 and other areas

References

External links
 
 Leiostyla anglica at Animalbase taxonomy,short description, distribution, biology,status (threats), images

anglica
Gastropods described in 1821